Kenardo Forbes (born 15 May 1988) is a Jamaican footballer who plays as a midfielder for USL Championship club Pittsburgh Riverhounds SC.

Career

Club
Forbes has played club football for Naggo Head, Waterhouse and Syracuse Silver Knights.

Forbes played for Waterhouse F.C. in the 2014–15 CONCACAF Champions League group stage.

Forbes signed for the Rochester Rhinos in USL for 2015.

On 21 December 2017, Forbes signed for Pittsburgh Riverhounds SC on a one-year contract with an option for 2019. He followed head coach Bob Lilley, who also moved to Pittsburgh after the Rhinos went on hiatus for the 2018 season.

International
He made his international debut for Jamaica in 2010.

Honours
Individual
 USL All-League Second Team (2): 2019, 2020
 USL All-League Second Team (5): 2016, 2017, 2018, 2021, 2022
 2015 Syracuse Silver Knights Offensive MVP

References

External links

 
 Kenardo Forbes MASL profile

1988 births
Living people
Jamaican footballers
Jamaica international footballers
Association football midfielders
Naggo Head F.C. players
Waterhouse F.C. players
Syracuse Silver Knights players
Rochester New York FC players
Pittsburgh Riverhounds SC players
Jamaican expatriate footballers
Jamaican expatriate sportspeople in the United States
Expatriate soccer players in the United States
USL Championship players
Utica City FC players